Orie Edgar Arntzen (October 18, 1909 – January 28, 1970) was an American professional baseball pitcher. He played in Major League Baseball (MLB) for the Philadelphia Athletics during the 1943 season.

Biography
Arntzen played in Minor League Baseball between 1933 and 1952; records for several of his seasons are incomplete. For seasons with records available, he had a win–loss record of 192–93, including a 25-win season with the Albany Senators of the Eastern League in 1949. His performance was recognized with The Sporting News Minor League Player of the Year Award. He pitched for farm teams of the St. Louis Cardinals, Cleveland Indians, Philadelphia Athletics, and Pittsburgh Pirates.

Arntzen's only season in Major League Baseball was 1943, when he appeared in 32 games (20 starts) for the Athletics. In  innings pitched, he struck out 66 batters while compiling a 4–13 record with a 4.22 earned run average. As a batter, he had eight hits in 50 at bats for a .160 batting average. In late September, he was traded to the Pirates for fellow pitcher Luke Hamlin, but would not pitch in MLB again.

Nicknamed "Old Folks", Arntzen died in 1970, aged 60, reportedly of a heart attack after being ill with kidney issues.

References

Further reading

External links

1909 births
1970 deaths
People from Adams County, Illinois
Baseball players from Illinois
Major League Baseball pitchers
Philadelphia Athletics players
Burlington Bees players
Davenport Blue Sox players
Peoria Tractors players
Norfolk Elks players
Martinsville Manufacturers players
Asheville Tourists players
Cedar Rapids Raiders players
Williamsport Grays players
Albany Senators players
Toronto Maple Leafs (International League) players
Duluth Dukes players
Cedar Rapids Indians players
Minor league baseball managers